Baltic Romani is group of dialects of the Romani language spoken in the Baltic states and adjoining regions of Poland and Russia. Half of the speakers live in Poland. It also called Balt Romani, Balt Slavic Romani, Baltic Slavic Romani, and Roma. Romani began as an Indo-European language, which morphed into an Indo-Iranian language, and then into an Indo-Aryan language. After that the Romani language broke down into Balkan Romani and Central Romani. Baltic Romani came from the Central Romani dialect which branches off into other dialects. There are a total of around 35,000 users in all countries.

Classification
Indo-European, Indo-Iranian, Indo-Aryan Central Zone, Romani, Central Romani

History
The first speakers of this language settled in southeast Europe during the 10th and 13th centuries in high numbers. From the 14th century onward, the language spread to central and western Europe as well. The immigrants that spoke this language had a darker complexion and many of these speakers were referred to as gypsies. The country of origin for this language turned out to be India after comparisons between other languages showed the similarity.

Geographic distribution
This language is spoken in the following countries;
Poland : Population 13,600
Belarus : Population 12,000
Estonia : Population 360 : Ethnic Population 460
Latvia : Population 8,000
Lithuania : Population 1350
Russian Federation

Official status 
This language is not an official language in any particular country but has other statuses in those which it is spoken.
Poland : 5 developing language. This is a recognized language in Poland.
Belarus : 5 developing language 
Estonia : 5 developing language
Latvia : 5 developing language
Lithuania : 5 developing language
Russian Federation : 5 developing language

Dialects and varieties 
Dialects are as follows;

('CL' stands for the main contact language):
Čuxny Romani in Estonia (CL: Estonian, Russian)
Finnish Romani (Fíntika Rómma) (CL: Finnish)
Latvian Romani (Lotfika) in Latvia, Estonia and Russia
Lithuanian Romani in Lithuania and Belarus
North Russian Romani (Xaladitka) in Baltic Russia and Belarus, spoken by the Ruska Roma
 Belarusian Romani or Belarus–Lithuanian Romani (Belarusko, Belaruskone-Litouskonengiro rakireben) in Belarus, spoken by the Belaruska Roma and Litovska Roma.
Polska Romani in Poland (CL: Polish)

Phonology
There are three simple stop positions in the Romani language. These come from the Indo-Aryan and are maintained in every dialect of this language. The positions are as follows; labial /p/, dental /t/, and velar /k/. Along with these stop positions, there are also palatal positions which are unique to the Romani language. Specific voicing alterations have changed grammatical endings and different dialects have different ways of interpreting vowels. Some have morphed into newer versions of the Romani language and others have implemented other elements like screams.

Grammar 
In the Romani language, the noun changes the endings of sentences to show meaning. It is used to illustrate how that specific word  acts in sentence and is similar to Latin. Romani verbs are similar to those in the Italian, Spanish, and Latin  languages. Depending on who is committing the action, the verb ending changes. There are many different verb endings in Romani which change the meaning of words. There are also different verb endings according to past and present tense in the language. The language also has grammatical genders as there are both masculine and feminine words. There are definite articles in this language along with, "different articles for masculine and feminine nouns, for subject and non-subject and for singular and plural articles".

Morphology
The language began as an Indo-European language morphed into an Indo-Iranian language. From there it morphed into an Indo-Aryan language which eventually led to Romani. After that the Romani language broke down into Balkan Romani and Central Romani. Baltic Romani came from the Central Romani dialect which branches off to the many other dialects listed above.

Syntax
Baltic languages, such as Baltic Romani, have unique rules that their numerals follow when they are written. Their numerals govern their nominals but not to the degree that Slavic languages do. Baltic genitives mark partial objects and sometimes subjects and also play a prominent role in the syntax of numeral constructions. Baltic languages are very similar as both Latvian and Latvian Romani share the same opposition of preverbs and verb particles.

Vocabulary
There is a large Indo-Aryan presence in this language that appears mainly in reference to body parts and functions. Along with bodily parts and functions, the Indo-Aryan presence also resides in words that reference time, nature, landscape, numerals, animals, and plants. There is a pre-European lexicon that is mixed in this language that mainly refers to spiritual and religious ideas, tools, and artefacts. Dwellings and Places are not represented the best in the inherited lexicon of this language.

Examples 
Using the word "sap" which means snake in Baltic Romani and is also a noun, the sentence it is used in will change as the noun does.

"Sap" (snake, subject of sentence) A snake is on the branch.

"Sapes" (snake, object of a sentence) I saw a snake.

"Sapeske" for a snake.

References

Bibliography
Bakker, P., & Ki︠u︡chukov, K. (2000). What is the Romani language? (Vol. 21). Univ of Hertfordshire Press

External links

Northern Romani dialects
Romani in Estonia
Romani in Latvia
Romani in Lithuania
Romani in Poland
Romani in Russia